The Previsora Tower is an office skyscraper located in sector Plaza Venezuela in Caracas, Venezuela and is the headquarters of the company Seguros La Previsora. Construction of the tower began in 1970 and finally was inaugurated in 1973. This is one of the most emblematic architectural figures of Caracas characterized by a Patek Phillipe luminous clock, which is visible from various points of the capital city.

External links

Buildings and structures in Caracas
Skyscraper office buildings in Venezuela
Office buildings completed in 1973